Morgan Rice is a self-published author of fantasy and sci-fi novels, who in 2011 stated she had no interest in pursuing traditional publishing for her young adult novels.

In 2013, the first three books of her Sorcerer's Ring series were among the best-selling books on Amazon.com: A Quest of Heroes ranked 11th, A March of Kings rank 14th, and A Feast of Dragons (actually A Fate of Dragons) 27th in the kids/teens/young-adults category.

In 2015, A Quest of Heroes was included in the Fierce box set of high fantasy reads.

In February 2016, four of her books were among the top 20 highest-selling American iBooks in the Sci-Fi/Fantasy categories. In April, Rise of the Valiant rose to sixth-highest and dropped to the 20th-highest in May.

For some of her book series, Rice gives the first out for free.

Selected works

Of Crowns and Glory series
There are eight books in the series:
Slave, Warrior, Queen (free)
Rogue, Prisoner, Princess
Knight, Heir, Prince
Rebel, Pawn, King
Soldier, Brother, Sorcerer
Hero, Traitor, Daughter
Ruler, Rival, Exile
Victor, Vanquished, Son

Kings and Sorcerers series
There are six books in the series:
Rise of the Dragons (free)
Rise of the Valiant
The Weight of Honor
A Forge of Valor
A Realm of Shadows
Night of the Bold

Sorcerer's Ring series
There are 17 books in the series:
 A Quest of Heroes (free and has a free graphic novel) published January 2013 in English, translated to Spanish before summer 2014.
 A March of Kings
 A Fate of Dragons
 A Clash of Honor (sometimes mistakenly reported as A Cry of Honor)
 A Vow of Glory
 A Charge of Valor
 A Rite of Swords
 A Grant of Arms
 A Sky of Spells
 A Sea of Shields
 A Reign of Steel 
 A Land of Fire
 A Rule of Queens
 An Oath of Brothers
 A Dream of Mortals
 A Joust of Knights
 A Gift of Battle

A Throne for Sisters series
There are eight books in the series:
 A Throne for Sisters
 A Court for Thieves
 A Song for Orphans
 A Dirge for Princes
 A Jewel for Royals
 A Kiss for Queens
 A Crown for Assassins
 A Clasp for Heirs

Survival trilogy
Arena One (free)
Arena Two
Arena Three

Vampire, Fallen series
Before Dawn

Vampire Journals series
There are twelve books in the series:
 Turned (free)
 Loved
 Betrayed
 Destined
 Desired (released in 2011)
 Betrothed
 Vowed
 Found
 Resurrected
 Craved
 Fated
 Obsessed

Way of Steel series
Only the Worthy

Age of the Sorcerers Series
There are eight books in the series

 Realm of Dragons
 Throne of Dragons
 Born of Dragons
 Ring of Dragons
 Crown of Dragons
 Dusk of Dragons
 Shield of Dragons
 Dream of Dragons

References

External links
 
 

21st-century American writers
21st-century American women writers
Living people
Women romantic fiction writers
Women science fiction and fantasy writers
Women writers of young adult literature
Year of birth missing (living people)